Matzinger is a German surname. Notable people with the surname include:

Günther Matzinger (born 1987), Austrian Paralympic runner
Polly Matzinger (born 1947), French-American immunologist 

German-language surnames